Ruizinho may refer to:
Ruizinho (footballer, born 1989), Portuguese footballer who plays as a midfielder
Ruizinho (footballer, born 1991), Portuguese footballer who plays as a forward